The 2004–05 Kazakhstan Hockey Championship was the 13th season of the Kazakhstan Hockey Championship, the top level of ice hockey in Kazakhstan. Eight teams participated in the league, and Kazzinc-Torpedo won the championship.

Standings

References
Kazakh Ice Hockey Federation

Kazakhstan Hockey Championship
Kazakhstan Hockey Championship seasons
1